Kristin Lysdahl (born 29 June 1996) is a Norwegian World Cup alpine ski racer. She competes in all disciplines, but focuses on the technical events of Giant slalom and Slalom. She has competed in three World Championships and the 2018 Winter Olympics.

World Cup results

Season standings

Race podiums

 1 podium – (1 PG)
 11 top tens

World Championship results

Olympic results

References

External links
 
 

1996 births
Living people
Sportspeople from Bærum
Norwegian female alpine skiers
Alpine skiers at the 2018 Winter Olympics
Olympic alpine skiers of Norway
Medalists at the 2018 Winter Olympics
Olympic medalists in alpine skiing
Olympic bronze medalists for Norway